William Dingsdale (1905 – 14 September 1965) was an English professional rugby league footballer who played in the 1920s, 1930s and 1940s.

Background
Billy Dingsdale's birth was registered in Prescot district, Lancashire, England, and his death aged 60 was registered in St. Helens district, Lancashire, England.

Playing career

International honours
Billy Dingsdale won caps for England while at Warrington in 1928 against Wales, in 1929 against Other Nationalities, in 1930 against Wales, and Other Nationalities, in 1931 against Wales, in 1932 against Wales, in 1933 against Other Nationalities, and won caps for Great Britain while at Warrington in 1929 against Australia (2 matches), and on the 1932 Great Britain Lions tour against Australia.

Championship final appearances
Billy Dingsdale played in Warrington's 3-14 defeat by Swinton in the Championship Final during the 1934–35 season, and the 11-13 defeat by Salford in the Championship Final during the 1936–37 season.

Challenge Cup Final appearances
Billy Dingsdale played left-, i.e. number 4, and scored a try in Warrington's 17-21 defeat by Huddersfield in the 1933 Challenge Cup Final during the 1932–33 season at Wembley Stadium, London on Saturday 6 May 1933, and in the 2-18 defeat by Leeds in the 1936 Challenge Cup Final during the 1935–36 season at Wembley Stadium, London on Saturday 18 April 1936.

County League appearances
Billy Dingsdale played in Warrington's victory in the Lancashire County League during the 1937–38 season.

County Cup Final appearances
Billy Dingsdale played in Warrington's 15-2 victory over Salford in the 1929 Lancashire County Cup Final during the 1929–30 season at Central Park, Wigan on Saturday 23 November 1929, and he played in the 10-9 victory over St. Helens in the 1932 Lancashire County Cup Final during the 1932–33 season at Central Park, Wigan on Saturday 19 November 1932, but he did not play in the 8-4 victory over Barrow in the 1937 Lancashire County Cup Final during the 1937–38 season at Central Park, Wigan on Saturday 23 October 1937, in front of a crowd of 12,000.

Club records
During January 1929, within a fortnight, Billy Dingsdale twice scored 4-tries in matches against Bradford Northern, firstly in a 35-7 victory at Bradford Northern, and then in a 65-0 win at Wilderspool Stadium, during the 1928–29 season he also equalled Warrington's "Most Tries In A Season" record with 28-tries, subsequently extended by Steve Ray to 33-tries, and then by Brian Bevan to 48, 57, 60, and lastly to 66-tries.

Honoured at Warrington Wolves
Billy Dingsdale is a Warrington Wolves Hall of Fame inductee.

Genealogical Information
Billy Dingsdale was the younger brother of the rugby league footballer; Thomas "Tommy" Dingsdale, and the older brother of rugby league / who played in the 1920s for Warrington (Heritage № 346); Benjamin "Ben" Dingsdale (born  – death unknown).

References

External links
(archived by web.archive.org) Statistics at wolvesplayers.thisiswarrington.co.uk
Search for "Billy Dingsdale" at britishnewspaperarchive.co.uk
Search for "William Dingsdale" at britishnewspaperarchive.co.uk

1905 births
1965 deaths
Broughton Rangers players
England national rugby league team players
English rugby league players
Great Britain national rugby league team players
Lancashire rugby league team players
Rugby league centres
Rugby league players from Prescot
Warrington Wolves players